Coradion altivelis, the highfin coralfish or highfin butterflyfish, is a species of marine ray-finned fish, a butterflyfish from the family Chaetodontidae. It is found in the Indo-West Pacific region from the Andaman Sea and Sumatra east to Papua New Guinea, north to southern Japan, south to northwest Australia and the Great Barrier Reef. This species can be found in coastal habitats including the seaward side of reefs, drop offs and quite shallow waters with silty substrates. They are omnivorous, although sponges comprise the major part of their diet. They form pairs for breeding.

References

External links
 

altivelis
Fish of Thailand
Marine fish of Northern Australia
Taxa named by Allan Riverstone McCulloch
Fish described in 1916